Mikhail Lvovich Matusovsky (23 July 1915, Luhansk, Yekaterinoslav Governorate  – 16 July 1990, Moscow) was a Soviet poet, a winner of the USSR State Prize (1977).

Biography
His father is Lev Matusovsky (Russian Wikipedia)

Mikhail Lvovich Matusovsky was born in Luhansk, Yekaterinoslav Governorate, Russian Empire in the Jewish family of a photographer. Graduated from Maxim Gorky Literature Institute (1939). PhD (1941). A participant of the Great Patriotic War. Awarded by the Order of the October Revolution, twice by the Order of the Red Banner of Labour, by the Order of the Patriotic War 2nd class, by the Order of the Red Star. A member of the USSR Union of Writers (1939).

He is famous for his lyric poems many of which became lyrics of the popular songs: "School Walz", "In the Damp Earth-Huts", "The Sacred Stone", "The Windows of Moscow", "Don't Forget" and "Moscow Nights" which was sung at the Moscow Youth Festival in 1957 and was played also by American pianist Van Cliburn in the White House in 1979, on the occasion of a visit by the former president of the USSR, Mikhail Gorbachev. This song made an entry into the "Guinness Book of World Records" as the song most frequently sang in the world and in March 1962 made Kenny Ball's disk reached #2 on the U.S. Billboard Hot 100 chart, and the UK Singles Chart.

Among the books: anthologies of poems "The People of Lugansk: A Book of Poems and Prosa" (1939), "My Genealogy" (1940), "Front: A Book of Poems" (1942), "A Song About Aidogdi Takhirov and Andrey Savushkin" (1943), "When Ilmen Lake Makes a Stir" (1944), "Poems" (1946), "Listening to Moscow: Poems" (1948), "The Street of Peace: Poems" (1951), "Everything That I Value: Poems and Songs" (1957), "The Poems Are Always With Us" (1958), "The Windows of Moscow: Poems and Songs" (1960), "How Are You, Earth: A book of Poems and Songs" (1963), "Don't Forget: Songs" (1964), "A shadow of a Man: A Book About Hiroshima" (1968), "It Was Recently, It Was Long Ago: Poems" (1970),"The Essence: Poetry and Poems" (1979), "Selected Works: in Two Volumes" (1982) and the memoirs "The Family Album" (1979).

References

External links
 mpsu.org.ua

1915 births
1990 deaths
People from Luhansk
People from Slavyanoserbsky Uyezd
Ukrainian Jews
Communist Party of the Soviet Union members
Soviet poets
Soviet male writers
Soviet songwriters
20th-century Russian poets
20th-century Russian male writers
Maxim Gorky Literature Institute alumni
Soviet war correspondents
Soviet military personnel of World War II
Recipients of the USSR State Prize
Recipients of the Order of the Red Banner of Labour
Recipients of the Order of the Red Star
Burials at Kuntsevo Cemetery